Joaquim Miguel Pedreirinho Pereirinha (born 26 November 1958) is a Portuguese former footballer who played as a full back.

Club career
Born in Lisbon, Pereirinha was a youth graduate at S.L. Benfica. He was called up to the first team at the age of 18 by manager John Mortimore, going on to mainly act as backup to Minervino Pietra over the course of three Primeira Liga seasons.

After two more years in the top flight with Amora FC, and a further ten between C.F. Os Belenenses and S.C. Farense where he alternated between that tier and the Segunda Liga, Pereirinha retired professionally at nearly 34.

Personal life
Pereirinha's son, Bruno, was also a footballer. He represented mainly Sporting CP and S.S. Lazio.

Honours
Benfica
Taça de Portugal: 1979–80

Belenenses
Segunda Liga: 1983–84

References

External links

1958 births
Living people
Footballers from Lisbon
Portuguese footballers
Association football defenders
Primeira Liga players
Liga Portugal 2 players
Segunda Divisão players
S.L. Benfica footballers
Amora F.C. players
C.F. Os Belenenses players
S.C. Farense players
União Montemor players
Portugal youth international footballers
Portugal under-21 international footballers